Sri Venkateswara Medical College is a medical college in Tirupati, Andhra Pradesh, India. The college was established in the year 1960. It has 240 Undergraduate and 146 postgraduate seats. The college is recognized by National Medical Council. For the details of college recognition by NMC  visit college website Svmctpt.edu.in

Teaching hospitals
SRi Venkateswara Ramnarain Ruia Government General Hospital (SVRRGGH)
Govt Maternity Hospital & Institute of Pregnant Women

Departments
Department of Anatomy 
Department of Biochemistry 
Department of Physiology 
Department of Pharmacology 
Department of Pathology 
Department of Microbiology 
Department of Forensic Medicine 
Department of ENT 
Department of Ophthalmology 
Department of Community Medicine 
Department of Pediatrics 
Department of Dermatology 
Department of Pulmonary Medicine 
Department of Radiology
Department of General Medicine 
Department of Orthopaedics 
Department of General Surgery 
Department of Gynaecology and Obstetrics 
Department of Psychiatry
Department of Anaesthesia 
Department of Dental 
Department of Blood Bank 
Department of Casualty 
Department of Medical Education Unit 
Super speciality departments 
Department of Neuro Surgery 
Department of Paediatric surgery 
Department Plastic and reconstructive surgery
Department of cardiothorasic surgery
Department of Urology
Department of Neurology
Department of Cardioliogy
Department of Nephrology

See also
Sri Padmavathi Medical College

References

Universities and colleges in Tirupati
Medical colleges in Andhra Pradesh
1960 establishments in Andhra Pradesh
Educational institutions established in 1960